James Acho, often credited as Jim Acho, is an American attorney, and sports law professor. Acho is a frequent guest on sports talk radio shows on a national level, and in the Detroit area. Acho is cited on air and in print as an authority on labor issues as applied to professional and collegiate sports unions and leagues.

Biography

Acho has been publicly credited by numerous retired NFL and MLB players for improved benefits and has represented current and retired players in litigation. Acho is a professor of sports law at Madonna University.

In January, 2015 Acho announced he'd accepted the nomination of retired NFL players to run for NFL Players Association Executive Director. Acho lost the election to incumbent NFLPA Chief DeMaurice Smith.

In 2019 and 2020, Acho made national news when he won the NFL concussion cases on behalf Pro Football Hall of Famer Gale Sayers and broadcast legend Pat Summerall.

References

American sportswriters
Living people
Michigan lawyers
Year of birth missing (living people)